Jagdfliegerführer Oberitalien (Fighter Leader Northern Italy) was part of Luftflotte 2 (Air Fleet 2), one of the primary divisions of the German Luftwaffe in World War II. It was formed in July 1943 in Bologna and subordinated to the Luftflotte 2. The headquarters were located at Bologna and moved to Pontecchio on March 18, 1944, moved again on July 15, 1944 to Verona.

Commanding officers

Fliegerführer
unknown
Oberstleutnant Günther Freiherr von Maltzahn, 5 October 1943 – December 1944
Oberst Eduard Neumann, December 1944 – April 1945
Major Hans von Hahn, April 1945 – 8 May 1945

References
Notes

References
 Oberitalien.htm Jagdfliegerführer Oberitalien @ Lexikon der Wehrmacht
 Jagdfliegerführer Oberitalien @ The Luftwaffe, 1933-45

Luftwaffe Fliegerführer
Military units and formations established in 1943
Military units and formations disestablished in 1945